Tartaul is a village in Cantemir District, Moldova.

Notable people
 Rodica Ciorănică

References

Villages of Cantemir District